Jeanne Sakata (born April 8, 1954) is an American film, television and stage actress and playwright.

Career
Her appearances include supporting roles in episodes of Knots Landing, LA Law, Port Charles, Providence, Family Law, ER, Desperate Housewives and others. Her first appearance on the big screen was in 1992 in the erotic thriller Poison Ivy. In 2005, she appeared in a minor role as a field reporter in the action film XXX: State of the Union.

Sakata has performed in many stage productions, working often with East West Players (EWP) in Los Angeles.  In 2002 she won the Ovation Award for Lead Actress in a Play, for her performance in Chay Yew's Red, at EWP.  In 2007, her first play, Dawn's Light: The Journey of Gordon Hirabayashi premiered at EWP. The play was later retitled as Hold These Truths. In 2019, she was an honoree at EWP's Night Market event in celebration of her work advancing "the visibility of Asian Americans nationally."

Filmography

References

External links

American television actresses
American film actresses
American film actors of Asian descent
American actresses of Japanese descent
American dramatists and playwrights of Japanese descent
American women dramatists and playwrights
Living people
1954 births
21st-century American women